Rik de Voest won in the final 6–0, 7–5, against Tim Smyczek.

Seeds

Draw

Finals

Top half

Bottom half

External links
Main Draw
Qualifying Draw

Challenger Banque Nationale de Rimouski
Challenger de Drummondville